Folwell is a neighborhood in the U.S. city of Minneapolis on its northside that is bound by Dowling Avenue to the north, Dupont Avenue North to the east, Lowry Avenue North to the south, and Penn Avenue North to the west. It is part of the larger Camden community. Located within the neighborhood is the 27-acre Folwell Park. The neighborhood and park are named after the American scholar and writer William Watts Folwell.

References

External links

Minneapolis Neighborhood Profile - Folwell
Folwell Neighborhood Association

Neighborhoods in Minneapolis